The Twenty-second Amendment may refer to the:

 Twenty-second Amendment to the United States Constitution – which sets a term limit for the U.S. president
 Twenty-second Amendment of the Constitution Bill 2001 – a failed proposal to amend the Constitution of Ireland
 22nd Amendment to the Constitution of Sri Lanka